Takaro is a suburb and constituent ward of Palmerston North, Manawatū-Whanganui, New Zealand.

It is located east of Highbury, west of Palmerston North Hospital Area and north of the CBD. It had a resident population of 5,253 in 2013, making up 6.6% of Palmerston North's population.

The area includes Takaro Park, Kawau Stream Reserve, Clausen Reserve, Gloucester Reserve, Coronation Park, Takaro Bowling Club, Takaro Tennis Club, Masonic Court, Rose A Lea Retirement Home and Palmerston Manor Retirement Home.

Demographics

It had a population of 5,748 at the 2018 New Zealand census, an increase of 177 people (3.2%) since the 2013 census, and an increase of 117 people (2.1%) since the 2006 census. There were 2,163 households. There were 2,823 males and 2,919 females, giving a sex ratio of 0.97 males per female, with 1,104 people (19.2%) aged under 15 years, 1,647 (28.7%) aged 15 to 29, 2,331 (40.6%) aged 30 to 64, and 669 (11.6%) aged 65 or older.

Ethnicities were 75.6% European/Pākehā, 22.6% Māori, 7.0% Pacific peoples, 9.3% Asian, and 2.6% other ethnicities (totals add to more than 100% since people could identify with multiple ethnicities).

The proportion of people born overseas was 16.6%, compared with 27.1% nationally.

Although some people objected to giving their religion, 53.0% had no religion, 31.7% were Christian, 1.4% were Hindu, 1.0% were Muslim, 1.3% were Buddhist and 3.8% had other religions.

Of those at least 15 years old, 903 (19.4%) people had a bachelor or higher degree, and 840 (18.1%) people had no formal qualifications. The employment status of those at least 15 was that 2,319 (49.9%) people were employed full-time, 675 (14.5%) were part-time, and 249 (5.4%) were unemployed.

Education

References

Suburbs of Palmerston North
Populated places in Manawatū-Whanganui